Return to the Sea is an American science documentary television series that aired on PBS from 1991 to 1992, with an additional special that was broadcast in 1995. The series focuses on topics of interest in recreational diving and the conservation of oceanic and coastal environments.

Synopsis
Underwater cinematographer Bill Lovin presents the series, in which viewers "return to the sea" in each episode. Episodes cover a wide range of topics including marine biology, shipwrecks and marine archaeology, underwater photography, decompression sickness, deep-sea exploration, threats to marine and coastal environments and undersea archeological sites, and the contribution of everyday people to recreational diving and conservation. Recurring themes in the series are how improvements in diving equipment have made recreational diving safe and accessible for everyone rather than only for scientists, explorers, and adventurers; how human carelessness and thoughtlessness can damage environments and endanger wildlife; and how everyday people can contribute to understanding and conserving marine and coastal environments.

Production notes

Some of the half-hour episodes broadcast in 1991 and 1992 cover single topics, while others are divided into two distinct segments. The 1995 special is the only one-hour episode and consists of three distinct segments.

Bill Lovin co-produced the series, presents and narrates each episode, wrote some of the episodes, and captured the underwater cinematography used in the series. The UNC Center for Public Television, rebranded as North Carolina Public Television by the show's second season, produced the series in association with Lovin's company Marine Grafics.

Broadcast history

Return to the Sea premiered on PBS in 1991 with a run of seven half-hour episodes for its first season. A second season of six half-hour episodes followed in 1992. The final episode, a one-hour special, aired in 1995.

Episodes

Season 1 (1991)

Season 2 (1992)

Special (1995)

Fair use access to episodes and segments

In 2020, Bill Lovin created the Web site OceanArchives and uploaded to it all 14 complete episodes of Return to the Sea — as well as separate video files of some of the individual segments of multi-segment episodes — so they can be viewed, downloaded, and used for free for non-commercial purposes under a fair use policy, with a goal of assisting educators and students. Individual episodes and segments are available as follows:

Fair use policy for videos at OceanArchives
Return to the Sea Episode 101 "A Day on the Reef" at OceanArchives
Return to the Sea Episode 102 "Secrets of the Shark" at OceanArchives
Return to the Sea Episode 103 "The Art of Underwater Photography" and "Fish Senses" at OceanArchives
Return to the Sea Episode 103 segment "The Art of Underwater Photography" at Ocean Archives
Return to the Sea Episode 103 segment "Fish Senses" at Ocean Archives
Return to the Sea Episode 104 "The Ocean at Night" and "The Sea of Cortez" at OceanArchives
Return to the Sea Episode 104 segment "The Ocean at Night" at OceanArchives
Return to the Sea Episode 104 segment "The Sea of Cortez" at OceanArchives
Return to the Sea Episode 105 "Graveyard of the Atlantic...Graveyard of the Pacific" at OceanArchives
Return to the Sea Episode 106 "People Who Make a Difference" at OceanArchives
Return to the Sea Episode 107 "The Reef at the End of the Road" and "Last Days of the Manatee" at OceanArchives
Return to the Sea Episode 201 "Life in a Salt Marsh" and "Big Sweep" at OceanArchives
Return to the Sea Episode 202 "Deep Sea Secrets" at OceanArchives
Return to the Sea Episode 203 "The Mystery of the Bends" at OceanArchives
Return to the Sea Episode 204 "Reunion" at OceanArchives
Return to the Sea Episode 205 "Small World" at OceanArchives
Return to the Sea Episode 206 "The Reef...and the Rainforest" at OceanArchives
Return to the Sea Episode 301 "Oceans Under Glass," "Swimming With Whales," and "Whales Weep Not" at OceanArchives
Return to the Sea Episode 301 segment "Oceans Under Glass" at OceanArchives
Return to the Sea Episode 301 segment "Swimming With Whales" at OceanArchives
Return to the Sea Episode 301 segment "Whales Weep Not" at OceanArchives

References

1991 American television series debuts
1995 American television series endings
1990s American documentary television series
English-language television shows
PBS original programming